Fodé Yannick Toure (born 29 September 2000) is a footballer who plays as a striker for Thun on loan from Young Boys. Born in Senegal, he is a Switzerland youth international.

Career
In 2018, he signed for the reserves of English Premier League side Newcastle United. In 2021, Toure signed for Young Boys in Switzerland. On 19 December 2021, he debuted for Young Boys during a 5–0 win over Lugano.

On 12 January 2022, Toure joined Wil on loan until the end of the season.

On 12 July 2022, Toure moved on a season-long loan to Thun.

References

External links

2000 births
Living people
Swiss men's footballers
Switzerland youth international footballers
Senegalese footballers
Swiss people of Senegalese descent
Senegalese emigrants to Switzerland
BSC Young Boys players
FC Wil players
FC Thun players
Swiss Super League players
Swiss Challenge League players
Swiss Promotion League players
Swiss 1. Liga (football) players
Association football forwards
Swiss expatriate footballers
Senegalese expatriate footballers
Swiss expatriate sportspeople in England
Senegalese expatriate sportspeople in England
Expatriate footballers in England